The Resal effect is a structural engineering term which refers to the way the compressive force acting on a flange of a tapered beam reduces the effective shear force acting on the beam.

References

Structural engineering